2012–13 Professional Development League may refer to:
 2012–13 Professional Development League 1, the top tier of under-21 academy football in England
 2012–13 Professional Development League 2, the second tier of under-21 academy football in England